Alexander White Roxburgh (19 September 1910 – 5 December 1985) was an English professional footballer who played as a goalkeeper in the Football League for Barrow and Blackpool.

Career statistics

References 

English Football League players
English footballers
Association football goalkeepers
Brentford F.C. wartime guest players
1910 births
1985 deaths
Footballers from Manchester
Nuneaton Borough F.C. players
Blackpool F.C. players
Barrow A.F.C. players
Hyde United F.C. players
Manchester City F.C. players